Thoissey is a commune in the Ain department in eastern France.

Geography
The Chalaronne forms the commune's southeastern border, then flows into the Saône, which forms its western border.

History

Historical facts 
This commune, formerly walled, was the second city of the principality of Dombes and housed, for this principality, a collège founded in 1680.

Population

Sights
 A Lavoir of the 19th century.
 A 19th-century church, restored in 2007, housing works of the Lyonnais painter, Daniel Sarrabat (17th century); a set of six paintings dedicated to Mary Magdalene; three delivered in 1706 and three in 1713.
 The apothecary's shop of the ancient sisters' hospital, of the 18th century. In 1700, a rich draper, Etienne Pollo, is responsible for the founding of Thoissey's hospital. In 1701, the duke of Maine gave the letters patent for the creation of “L’Hôpital de la Charité”. The apothecary's shop was built between 1731 and 1735. Walnut boiseries on the walls are the work of Jean Noblet, master carpenter. The ceiling was painted by Lugnot on a  marouflaged canvas (cf. photo). About 60 faience pots from Nevers decorated with a cobalt blue camaieu were used to collect the substances used by the apothecary, they were placed in niches and Renaissance style sideboards.

Personalities
 Jean-Baptiste Marchand, French explorer and general officer, born and buried in Thoissey.

See also
Communes of the Ain department

References

External links

 Dombes and Thoissey

Communes of Ain
Dombes
Ain communes articles needing translation from French Wikipedia